This article lists all historical 32 Spokespersons (include 6 spokeswomen) of the Ministry of Foreign Affairs of the People's Republic of China since 1976.

List of Spokespersons

References

Ministry of Foreign Affairs of the People's Republic of China
Ministry of Foreign Affairs